This is a list of cinemas that exist or have existed in Metro Manila, Philippines.

Overview

Unlike most countries, theater chains in the Philippines in general are managed solely by mall owners in their respective leisure divisions rather than being outsourced by other companies. The only exception is the Ortigas Cinemas in Estancia, where SM Prime co-manages the cinema component as the former owns a stake in developer Ortigas & Company.

Ticket prices range from around 200 pesos to as high as 700 pesos, depending on the theater location, time and date, and if premium features are available. Pricing will be higher if a blockbuster film is being shown. Most local government units in the region give free movie tickets to registered Senior Citizens and Persons with Disabilities in their locality.

Seating can be picked by the viewer through a screen, in the case of reserved seating, or if in the case of free seating, the viewer can choose a seat while inside the theater. Online booking is available in major theater chains.

During the first and last full screening, the audience must stand for the Philippine National Anthem as mandated by law.

Araneta City Cineplex

Ayala Malls Cinemas

Ever Gotesco Cinemas

Megaworld Cinemas

Robinsons Movieworld

SM Cinemas

Vista Cinemas/Starmall Cinemas

Others

Gallery

See also
Art Deco theaters of Manila
Cinema of the Philippines
List of shopping malls in Metro Manila

References

External links
ClickTheCity.com
Movies @Juice.ph View movie schedules
NowShowing.ph

Metro Manila
Metro Manila
Buildings and structures in Metro Manila
Metro Manila-related lists
Philippine film-related lists
Lists of buildings and structures in the Philippines